Water & Solutions is the fourth album by American rock band Far.

Background
The album was recorded in April 1997, nearly a full year before being released in March 1998. During the 11 month interval, the band released the promotional Soon EP in October 1997, which contained two songs from the upcoming album, as well as a cover of the Jawbox song "Savory", and an acoustic version of the 1996 track "Sorrow's End". That year, the band also released a 7" vinyl split with Immortal Records label mates Incubus, and performed several songs from the still unreleased Water & Solutions on tour.

Release and reception
Stephen Thomas Erlewine of Allmusic gave Water & Solutions a positive four star review, stating it "finds the Sacramento-based alternative metal band coming into their own, creating a distinctive fusion of the sober, grinding guitars of Helmet and Tool" and that "the best moments of Water & Solutions show that Far have carved out their own alterna-metal niche." French publication Rocksound claimed in 1998 that the album's sound was "made up of the best elements of Deftones and Radiohead."  In 1999, CMJ New Music Report referred to it as a "sonically flawless masterpiece."

More contemporary reviews have cited Water & Solutions as a progenitor to the 2000s emo rock movement, with PopMatters remarking in 2004 the record was "a few minutes before everything emo blew the hell up; the album and the band that made it disintegrated quickly after its release."

In 2018, Jonah Matranga went on a tour in honor of the album's 20th anniversary. The Pauses served as the opening act and Matranga's backing band.

Track listing

Personnel
Far
Jonah Matranga – vocals, guitar
Shaun Lopez – guitar
John Gutenberger – bass
Chris Robyn – drums

Production
Dave Sardy – producer
Greg Gordon – engineer
Stephen Marcussen – mastering
Don C. Tyler – digital editing

References

External links
 The Making of Water & Solutions - 1997

1998 albums
Far (band) albums
Albums produced by Dave Sardy
Epic Records albums
Immortal Records albums